Kang (康, pinyin: Kāng) is a Chinese surname. It is considered one of the "Nine Sogdian Surnames," and in this context it is derived from the city of Samarkand. It is the 88th name on the Hundred Family Surnames poem.

 Kang Senghui (died 280), Buddhist monk of Sogdian origin
 Kang Youwei (1858–1927), reformist political figure from the late Qing dynasty
 Kang Tongbi (1887–1969), social activist from the early Republic of China period, Kang Youwei's daughter
 Kang Sheng (1898–1975), high-ranking official in the People's Republic of China
 Kang Keqing (1911–1992), politician, wife of Zhu De
 Kang Laiyi (1936–2019), epidemiologist
 Kang Hui (born 1972), news anchor
 Kang Ching-jung (康晋榮), or commonly known as Kang Kang (康康), is a Taiwanese entertainer and singer
 Kang Jingwei (康敬伟, Jeffrey Kang, born 1970), Chinese billionaire entrepreneur, founder and CEO of Cogobuy Group

See also
 Kang (disambiguation)
 Kang (Korean surname), written 姜
 Jiang (surname)
 Jiāng (surname 江) sometimes Romanized "Kang"
 Jiāng (surname 姜) sometimes Romanized "Kang"

References

Chinese-language surnames
Individual Chinese surnames